RoboCup is an annual international robotics competition founded in 1996 by a group of university professors (including Hiroaki Kitano, Manuela M. Veloso, and Minoru Asada). The aim of the competition is to promote robotics and AI research by offering a publicly appealing – but formidable – challenge.

The name RoboCup is a contraction of the competition's full name, "Robot Soccer World Cup" (based on the FIFA World Cup), but there are many other areas of competition such as "RoboCupRescue", "RoboCup@Home" and "RoboCupJunior". Peter Stone is the current president of RoboCup, and has been since 2019.

The official goal of the project:
"By the middle of the 21st century, a team of fully autonomous humanoid robot soccer players shall win a soccer game, complying with the official rules of FIFA, against the winner of the most recent World Cup."

RoboCup leagues

The contest currently has six major domains of competition, each with a number of leagues and sub-leagues. These include:

 RoboCup Soccer
Standard Platform League (formerly Four Legged League) (Standard Platform League Homepage)
Small Size League
Middle Size League (Middle Size League Homepage)
Simulation League
2D Soccer Simulation
3D Soccer Simulation
Humanoid League
RoboCup Rescue League
Rescue Robot League
Rescue Simulation League
Rapidly Manufactured Robot Challenge
RoboCup@Home, which debuted in 2006, focuses on the introduction of autonomous robots to human society
RoboCup@Home Open Platform League (formerly just RoboCup@Home)
Robocup@Home Domestic Standard Platform League
RoboCup@Home Social Standard Platform League
RoboCup Logistics League, which debuted in 2012, is an application-driven league inspired by the industrial scenario of a smart factory
RoboCup@Work, which debuted in 2016, "targets the use of robots in work-related scenarios"
RoboCupJunior
Soccer League
OnStage (formerly Dance) League
Rescue League
Rescue CoSpace League

Each team is fully autonomous in all RoboCup leagues. Once the game starts, the only input from any human is from the referee.

RoboCup editions

The formal RoboCup competition was preceded by the (often unacknowledged) first International Micro Robot World Cup Soccer Tournament (MIROSOT) held by KAIST in Taejon, Korea, in November 1996. This was won by an American team from Newton Labs, and the competition was shown on CNN.

RoboCup was canceled in 2020 due to COVID-19. The planned host location of Bordeaux will host in 2023.

RoboCup Asia-Pacific editions

European RoboCupJunior Championship

RoboCup local events

2021 
 RoboCup Kazakhstan, Nur-Sultan, Kazakhstan
 RoboCup Portugal Open, virtual
 RoboCup Russia Open, Tomsk, Russia
 RoboCup Brazil Open, virtual

2020 

 RoboCup Japan Open 2020, virtual
 RoboCup China Open 2020, virtual
 RoboCup Brazil Open 2020, virtual

Events were cancelled due to COVID-19

2019 

 RoboCup Portuguese Open 2019, Gondomar, Portugal
 RoboCup Brazil Open 2019, Rio Grande, Brazil
 RoboCup Asia Pacific 2019, Moscow, Russia
 RoboCup German Open 2019, Magdeburg, Germany
 RoboCup China Open 2019, Shaoxing, China

2018

RoboCup Portugal Open 2018, Torres Vedras, Portugal
RoboCup Asia Pacific 2018, Kish Island, Iran
RoboCup Iran Open 2018, Tehran, Iran
RoboCup UAE 2018, Abu Dhabi, United Arab Emirates
RoboCup German Open 2018, Magdeburg, Germany

2017

RoboCup Portugal Open 2017, Coimbra, Portugal
 RoboCup Iran Open 2017, Tehran, Iran
 RoboCup German Open 2017, Magdeburg, Germany
 RoboCup Russia Open 2017, Tomsk, Russia
 RoboCup US Open 2017, Miami, United States
 RoboCup China Open 2017, Shaoxing, China

2016

RoboCup Portugal Open 2016, Bragança, Portugal
 RoboCup China Open 2016, Hefei, China
 RoboCup European Open 2016, Eindhoven, Netherlands

2015

RoboCup Portugal Open 2015, Vila Real, Portugal
 RoboCup China Open 2015, Guiyang, China
 RoboCup Iran Open 2015, Tehran, Iran
 GermanOpen 2015, Magdeburg, Germany

2014

 RoboCup Portugal Open 2014, Espinho, Portugal
 RoboCup China Open 2014, Hefei, China
 RoboCup Iran Open 2014, Tehran, Iran
 RoboCup German Open, Magdeburg, Germany

2013

RoboCup Portugal Open 2013, Lisbon, Portugal
 RoboCup Iran Open 2013, Tehran, Iran
 RoboCup German Open, Magdeburg, Germany

2012

 RoboCup Portugal Open 2012, Guimarães, Portugal
 RoboCup Dutch Open, Eindhoven, Netherlands
 RoboCup German Open, Magdeburg, Germany
 RoboCup Iran Open, Tehran, Iran
 RoboCup SSL North American Open, Vancouver, British Columbia, Canada

2011

 RoboCup German Open, Magdeburg, Germany
 RoboCup Portugal Open, Lisboa, Portugal
 RoboCup Iran Open 2011, Tehran, Iran

2010

 RoboCup Portugal Open, Leiria, Portugal
 Iran Open 2010, Tehran, Iran
 Latin America & Brazil Open 2010, São Bernardo do Campo, Brazil
 RoboCup Mediterranean Open 2010, Rome, Italy
 RoboCup German Open (unofficial all-European tournament), Magdeburg, Germany
 AUT Cup 2010, Tehran, Iran

See also
 RoboCup Junior
 Robot
 Botball
 FIRST
 BEST Robotics
 RobotCub Consortium, a humanoid robot project to study cognition via robotics

References

External links

 
 RoboCup@Home league, aims to develop service and assistive robot technology with high relevance for future personal domestic applications.

 
Engineering competitions
Dance animation
Recurring events established in 1997
Articles containing video clips
Robotics competitions